Grace Dane Mazur (born 1944) is an American writer. Her works include the novels Trespass (1998) and The Garden Party (2018), the short story collection Silk (1996), and Hinges (2010), a book that combines "personal essay, literary criticism, art history, and memoir."

Biography
Initially pursuing a career in the biological sciences, Mazur earned a PhD in cellular and developmental biology from Harvard University in 1981, after which she spent a number of years researching morphogenesis and micro-architecture in silkworms at Harvard's Biological Laboratories.  In 1993, she earned a Master of Fine Arts in fiction from Warren Wilson College.  Mazur worked as fiction editor at the Harvard Review from 1993 to 2004, and has worked as fiction editor at Tupelo Press from 2009 to the present. She has taught creative writing at the Harvard Extension School and the Master of Fine Arts program at Warren Wilson College.  Her works have been reviewed in The New York Times, The Washington Post, the Los Angeles Times, and People, as well as on Vox.  She is married to mathematician Barry Mazur, the Gerhard Gade University Professor and senior fellow at Harvard University.

Selected works

Novels
The Garden Party, Random House 2018 
Trespass:  A Novel, Nocturnum Press 1999

Short-story collections
Silk, Brookline Books 1996.

Nonfiction
Hinges: Meditations on the Portals of the Imagination, CRC Press 2010.

References

External links
 

1944 births
Living people
American women novelists
Harvard University alumni
Warren Wilson College alumni
American fiction writers
Warren Wilson College faculty
21st-century American women writers
Writers from Boston
Harvard Extension School faculty
American women academics